Michiko Katagiri (片桐 美智子, Katagiri Michiko) is a paralympic swimmer from Japan competing mainly in category SB3 events.

Michiko competed at the 1992 Summer Paralympics in the 100m breaststroke for SB3 class athletes and won the bronze medal.

References

External links
 

Paralympic swimmers of Japan
Swimmers at the 1992 Summer Paralympics
Paralympic bronze medalists for Japan
Japanese female breaststroke swimmers
Living people
Medalists at the 1992 Summer Paralympics
Year of birth missing (living people)
Paralympic medalists in swimming
S3-classified Paralympic swimmers
20th-century Japanese women